Carl Ernest Taylor, MD, DrPH (July 26, 1916 – February 4, 2010) founder of the academic discipline of international health who dedicated his life to the well-being of the world's marginalized people. He was the founding chair of the Department of International Health at the Johns Hopkins Bloomberg School of Public Health. He was a key contributor to the Alma Ata Declaration. At the age of 88, this energetic man assumed the challenging position as Country Director for the nonprofit organization Future Generations Afghanistan where he led innovative field-based activities until age 90.  He has worked in over 70 countries and have students from more than 100 countries. He was sharing this near century-long perspective with his students up until a week before his death.

Early life and education
Taylor was born in Landour, a small hill station contiguous with Mussoorie in the Western Himalayas. His parents were medical missionaries in the region. He spent his early years assisting his parents with a mobile clinic in the Indian jungles, including the then-extant riverine jungles along the Ganges river, where the river leaves the Himalayas and enters the Gangetic Plain. He came back to the US and earned his medical degree from Harvard Medical School. After that, he started practising medicine in Panama where he also met and married his wife. They were together for 58 years until she died in 2001.

In 1947, he returned to India and became the director of Fatehgarh Presbyterian Hospital, near Agra. During the Partition of India, he led a medical team helping the local people. He came back to Harvard and completed his DrPH and his dissertation was about the relation between nutrition and infection and it is regarded as a seminal work in this field.

Alma-Ata Declaration
Taylor was the primary World Health Organization consultant in preparing documents in 1978 for the Alma Ata World Conference on Primary Health Care and was a key contributor to the Alma Ata Declaration. From 1957 through 1983, he advised WHO on a wide range of international health matters. In 1972, Taylor became the founding chair of the National Council for International Health, now known as the Global Health Council. He was also the founding chair of the International Health Section of the American Public Health Association.

Death
After a long fight with prostate cancer, he died on February 4, 2010. He was 93 and still active and he had his last lecture on January 27, 2010, in his favourite course: Case Studies in Primary Health Care at Johns Hopkins School of Public Health. He is survived by his two brothers, John and Gordon, two sisters, Gladys and Margaret, three children, Daniel,  Betsy, Henry, and nine grandchildren.

Publications
Taylor published more than 190 peer-reviewed journal articles, books, chapters and policy monographs.

 Taylor, Daniel C. Taylor, Carl E., Taylor, Jesse O. Empowerment On An Unstable Planet: From Seeds of Human Energy to a Scale of Global Change (New York: Oxford University Press, 2012)
 Taylor-Ide, Daniel C., and Taylor, Carl E., Just and Lasting Change: When Communities Own Their Futures. Johns Hopkins University Press, Baltimore, MD, March 2002
 Taylor, Carl E., Scaling Up Social Development, LEISA Magazine. October 2001.
 Taylor, Carl E., Ethical Issues Influencing Health for All Beyond the Year 2000, Infectious Disease Clinics on North America. Vol. 9: 223-233, 1995.
 Taylor, Carl E., Surveillance for Equity in Primary Health Care: Policy Implications for the International Experience, International Journal of Epidemiology. Vol. 21: 1043-1049, 1992.

Honors and awards
In addition to his earned degrees, Taylor received honorary degrees from Muskingum College, Towson State University, China’s Tongji University, Peking Union Medical College and Johns Hopkins University. In 1993, President Bill Clinton recognized him for "Sustained work to protect children around the world in especially difficult circumstances and a life-time commitment to community based primary care.”

Legacy
With an eight-decade long career in international health, he has influenced thousands around the world. His stories of adventure and service enabled them to believe that they too could create just and lasting change. He continued to teach a course at JHSPH on Primary Health Care with special emphasis on community-based approaches until one week before his death. He has inspired and influenced directly or indirectly many successful community-based health interventions, such as Comprehensive Rural Health Project, Jamkhed and the Home-based newborn care developed by Drs Abhay Bang and Rani Bang among many others.

Videos and pictures
 Reflecting on community health, the 1978 Alma Ata conference on primary health care, and his students' opportunities to change public health. (3 minutes; from a 2008 interview)
 Interview at Global Health TV: At 2008's International Conference on Global Health, he received the award for lifetime achievement. Prof. Taylor took time out to talk with Global Health TV and reflect on his long career.
 Pictures of Carl Taylor at caringbridge.org
 Pictures of Carl Taylor at globalhealth.org

See also
 Alma Ata Declaration
Global health
International health
Jamkhed
Primary Health Care

References

External links
 Faculty page at Johns Hopkins School Public Health
 Biography at Johns Hopkins School Public Health
 Carl E. Taylor, Global Health Legend, Dies
 Carl E. Taylor, The founder of Hopkins' international health program worked to improve medicine in Third World countries
Facebook page

2010 deaths
1916 births
Harvard Medical School alumni
American public health doctors
Johns Hopkins University faculty
Harvard School of Public Health alumni
People from Uttarakhand
Members of the National Academy of Medicine